Alan Bartholomai AM (1938-2015) was a geologist and palaeontologist, and Director of the Queensland Museum from 1969-1999.

Alan Bartholomai was born on 31 December 1938 in Boonah, Queensland. He attended Boonah State School and after his parents moved the family to the Gold Coast, he attended the Southport State School. He boarded at Gatton College in 1953-1954 where he took his Junior Certificate, and completed his senior studies at Southport State High School. He was able to obtain a Commonwealth Scholarship to attend the University of Queensland and pursue a BSc in geology and zoology, graduating in 1960.

Career 
After graduation, Bartholomai was appointed the Curator of Geology at the Queensland Museum. He studied his MSc on fossil kangaroos, under the supervision of Dorothy Hill, and graduated in 1969. He continued his study toward a PhD, taking this in 1973 with a thesis on the Stratigraphy, skeletal morphology and evolution of the Upper Cainozoic and recent Macropodidae of Queensland. He became Director of the Queensland Museum in 1969 and continued in this role until 1999. Despite the difficulties of balancing this job with research, he maintained a steady interest in Cretaceous fish faunas of the Great Artesian Basin and published eleven papers on this topic.

The Queensland Museum expanded under his direction; staff employed there increased from 44 to 200. He sought to employ professional staff with science and curatorial backgrounds and help the Museum build visitor numbers by revitalising displays. The Museum purchased life sized models of Triceratops horridus in 1976 and Tyrannosaurs rex in 1978, at his recommendation. The Museum was also moved to the South Bank Cultural Centre Precinct in 1985, as it had outgrown its previous location in Fortitude Valley near the Brisbane Exhibition show grounds.

Further extensions to the Queensland Museum network occurred during Bartholomai's time as Director, including the establishment of the Museum of Lands, Mapping and Surveying at Woolloongabba, Woodworks in Gympie, the Cobb & Co Museum in Toowoomba, the Museum of Tropical Queensland in Townsville, the Museum of North West Queensland in Mt Isa and the Science Centre in Brisbane.

He was an Honorary Research Fellow with James Cook University. He served on a number of committees at both state and national level. He was a member of the World Wildlife Fund for Nature, the Lizard Island Research Committee (Australian Museum) and a past President of the Royal Society of Queensland.

Bartholomai participated in the American Museum of Natural History expedition in 1971. He also undertook palaeontological work at Rewan in central Queensland. He joined the Natural History Museum (British) expedition to collect Queensland Mesozoic vertebrates in 1978. He had studied the Riversleigh site in Queensland in 1965, before it would become a major fossil site in 1975. He facilitated the acquisition of the Muttaburrasaurus and Minmi dinosaur specimens.

Other collections which Bartholomai pursued for the Museum included a collection of personal memorabilia of Sir Charles Kingsford Smith.

Bartholomai established exchange relationships for the Museum with Saitama Prefectural Museum of Japan in 1989. He was a part of the Australian delegation to the 1998 United Nations Environment Program Convention on Biological Diversity, which aimed to stress the vital role of exchange in assisting the taxonomy of biological collections. He was also an advocate for the return of 3,297 items of the Sir William Macgregor Collection of Papua New Guinea Artefacts to PNG from 1979-1999.

Honours 
· 2012 - Member of the Order of Australia for his service to the advancement of science, particularly through administrative roles with the Queensland Museum.

Fossils named for him 

 Didymalgia bartholomai Cook, 1997 (Fossil Gastropod)
 Megateg bartholomai Raven & Stumkat, 2005 (Spider) 
 Hypsiprymnodon bartholomaii Flannery & Archer, 1987 (Fossil Marsupial)

Fossil taxa identified by him 

 Thylacoleo crassidentatus Bartholamai, 1962
 Sthenurus antiquus Bartholomai, 1963 
 Sthenurus notabilis Bartholomai, 1963 
 Troposodon Bartholomai, 1967 
 Protemnodon chinchillaensis Bartholomai, 1973
 Protemnodon devisi Bartholomai, 1973 
 Fissuridon pearsoni Bartholomai, 1973 
 Macropus rama Bartholomai, 1975 
 Macropus woodsi Bartholomai, 1975 
 Macropus piltonensis Bartholomai, 1975 
 Troposodon Bartholomai, 1978 
 Troposodon bluffensis Bartholomai, 1978 
 Protemnodon snewini Bartholomai, 1978 
 Macropus (Osphranter) pavana Bartholomai, 1978 
 Phascolarctos stirtoni Bartholomai, 1968 
 Dasyurus dunmalli Bartholomai, 1971 
 Kadimakara Bartholamai, 1979 
 Kadimakara australiensis Bartholamai, 1979 
 Kudnu Bartholomai, 1979 
 Kudnu mackinlayi Bartholomai, 1979 
 Muttaburrasaurus Bartholomai & Molnar, 1981 
 Muttaburrasaurus langdoni Bartholomai & Molnar, 1981 
 Cooyoo australis Lees & Bartholomai, 1987 
 Richmondichthys Bartholomai, 2004 
 Ptykoptychion wadeae Bartholomai, 2008 
 Euroka Bartholomai, 2010 
 Euroka dunravenensis Bartholomai, 2010 
 Eurokidae Bartholomai, 2010 
 Pachyrhizodus grawi Bartholomai, 2012 
 Marathonichthys Bartholomai, 2013 
 Marathonichthys coyleorum Bartholomai, 2013 
 Stewartichthys Bartholomai, 2013 
 Stewartichthys leichhardti Bartholomai, 2013 
 Canaryichthys Bartholomai, 2015 
 Canaryichthys rozefeldsi Bartholomai, 2015

Personal life 
Bartholomai married Patricia Sheehy and they had three children- Dean, Kim and Leigh. He died on 17 December 2015.

References 

1938 births
2015 deaths
Australian paleontologists
Members of the Order of Australia